The 1965 Tour de Romandie was the 19th edition of the Tour de Romandie cycle race and was held from 6 May to 9 May 1965. The race started in Geneva and finished in Vallorbe. The race was won by Vittorio Adorni.

General classification

References

1965
Tour de Romandie
May 1965 sports events in Europe